Theodore "Ted" Vincent Kondrich (July 10, 1935 – February 6, 2018) was the Republican member of the Pennsylvania House of Representatives.

Biography

Ted Kondrich was a 1953 graduate of Turtle Creek High School and studied accounting at Duquesne University. He spent most of his career as an accountant for Westinghouse, but his true vocation was public service. In addition to his time in the Army, Ted served as a Plum Borough councilman, Pennsylvania state representative, deputy director of the Allegheny County Elections Department and as special consultant to Allegheny County district attorney, Stephen A. Zappala Jr.  Ted was known and highly respected for his cooperative, bipartisan approach and unwavering commitment to the common good for all people.

A devout Roman Catholic, Ted was a man of great faith. Throughout his life, he was an active member of various parishes within the Diocese of Pittsburgh, including St. Colman (Turtle Creek), Our Lady of Joy and Saint John the Baptist (Plum), and, most recently, St. Richard (Gibsonia).

Career
 United States Army (1958-1960)
 Accountant, Westinghouse Corporation (28 years)
 Elected, Council, Plum Borough (1980-1983)
Elected as a Republican to the Pennsylvania House of Representatives in 1988; unsuccessful campaign for reelection to the House (1990)
 Republican Caucus, Pennsylvania House of Representatives
 Division manager, Allegheny County Board of Elections (1996-2003)
 Appointed, Pennsylvania Inter-branch Commission for Gender, Racial, and Ethnic Fairness (2005)
Special Consultant, District Attorney's Office, Allegheny County

References

1935 births
2018 deaths
People from Turtle Creek, Pennsylvania
Republican Party members of the Pennsylvania House of Representatives
Duquesne University alumni
Catholics from Pennsylvania